Sophie of Saxony (29 April 1587 – 9 December 1635) was a member of the Albertine branch of the House of Wettin.  She was a princess of Saxony by birth and by marriage a Duchess of Pomerania-Stettin.

Life 
Sophie was a daughter of the Elector Christian I of Saxony (1560–1591) from his marriage to Sophie (1568–1622), the daughter of Elector John George of Brandenburg.

She married on 26 August 1610 in Dresden to Duke Francis of Pomerania-Stettin (1577–1620).  No children were born from this marriage.  After Francis's death, Sophie received the city and district of Wolin as her wittum.  She administered the district during the difficult years of the Thirty Years' War.  Between 1622 and 1626, she built a new residence in Wolin, because the old Wolin Castle was rather dilapidated.

After her death, the district fell back to Duke Bogislaw XIV of Pomerania.  However, all movable property, such as furniture and the grain stocks, were confiscated by the Swedish army, because Sweden was at war with Saxony and the Sweden considered her a Saxon.

Sophie was initially buried in the ducal crypt in Szczecin, but in 1650 her body was transferred to the Sophienkirche in Dresden.

Ancestors

References 
 Heinrich Berghaus: Landbuch des Herzogthums Pommern und des Fürstenthums Rügen, part 3, vol. 1, W. Dietze, Anklam, 1867, p. 615 (Online).
 Ute Essegern: Keine Totenruhe für Sophia von Sachsen in Stettin. Pommern, Sachsen und Schweden im Streit um das Erbe, In: Pommern. Zeitschrift für Kultur und Geschichte, vol. 44 (2006), issue 2, p. 18–25.
 Christian Ernst Weiße: Neueste Geschichte des Königreichs Sachsen seit dem Prager Frieden bis auf unsere Zeiten, vol. 1, Hinrichs, Leipzig, 1808, p. 59 ff (Online).
 Ute Essegern: Sophia (Sophie) von Sachsen. In: :de:Sächsische Biografie,
published by the Institut für Sächsische Geschichte und Volkskunde, edited by Martina Schattkowsky

External links 
 http://www.guide2womenleaders.com/womeninpower/Womeninpower1600.htm

German princesses
House of Wettin
Nobility from Dresden
House of Griffins
1587 births
1635 deaths
Albertine branch
Burials at Freiberg Cathedral
Daughters of monarchs